Caspar Ziegler, also Kaspar Ziegler, (15 September 1621 – 17 April 1690) was a German jurist, poet, hymnwriter and composer. He was the Rektor of the University of Wittenberg.

Career 
Ziegler was born in Leipzig the son of Caspar Ziegler sr., a lawyer and Prokonsul in the town council, and his wife Anna (née Walter, the widow of Johann Kürsten). He studied at the University of Leipzig.

In 1638, Ziegler was a Baccalaureus of philosophy, permitted to lecture at the university. As his parents wished him to study theology, he also studied with Hieronymus Kronmeyer and Johann Hülsemann. In November 1652, he began to study law in Leipzig with Polycarp Wirth and Andreas Eckholt. In 1655, he received the doctor's degree in law.

In 1654, he was appointed professor at the University of Wittenberg, at the same to the court. In 1661, he was appointed Rektor (director) of the University. He reorganized its library which had been destroyed during the Thirty Years' War.

He died in Wittenberg after an infection from a broken leg, and was buried in the Schlosskirche on 24 April 1690.

Works 
Some poems by Ziegler were set to music. He was a friend of the composers Johann Rosenmüller and Heinrich Schütz and collaborated with them. Ziegler wrote a treatise about madrigals, Von den Madrigalen, published in 1653, as requested by Schütz His poem "Ich freue mich in dir" (I rejoice in you) became a hymn and was the basis for Johann Sebastian Bach's chorale cantata for Christmas Ich freue mich in dir, BW 133.

Among his works are:
 Jesus oder zwanzig Elegien über Geburth, Leiden u. Auferstehung unseres Herrn. Leipzig 1648
 Von den Madrigalen ...  Leipzig 1653, Wittenberg 1685 Online, Frankfurt am Main 1971
 De dote ecclesiae – diatribe canonica
 De iuribus Majestatis Wittenberg 1681
 Rabulistica sive de artibus rabulariis. Dresden 1685
 Notae et animadversiones Wittenberg 1686

References

Bibliography 
 Christian von Bar, Peter Dopffel (ed.): Deutsches internationales Privatrecht im 16. Und 17. Jahrhundert. vol. 1, p. 561 Digitalisat
 Walther Killy: (1992)  Literaturlexikon: Autoren und Werke deutscher Sprache. Gütersloh München: Bertelsmann-Lexikon-Verl vol. 12, p. 487 
 Walter Friedensburg: Geschichte der Universität Wittenberg. Niemeyer, Halle/Saale 1917
 : Restlose Auswertungen von Leichenpredigten und Personalschriften für genealogische und kulturhistorische Zwecke. vol. 6, R 5095
 
 Ziegler, Caspar ein Doctor der Rechten auf der Universität zu Wittenberg Grosses vollständiges Universal-Lexicon, vol. 62, Leipzig 1749, col. 559–574.

External links 
 
 

German male writers
Jurists from Saxony
Academic staff of the University of Wittenberg
German Protestant hymnwriters
1621 births
1690 deaths